Karine Charlier (born 22 April 1977) is a French gymnast. She competed in six events at the 1992 Summer Olympics.

References

1977 births
Living people
French female artistic gymnasts
Olympic gymnasts of France
Gymnasts at the 1992 Summer Olympics
Sportspeople from Créteil
20th-century French women